Soul Provider is the sixth studio album by American recording artist Michael Bolton. The album was released on June 19, 1989 by Columbia Records/CBS. To date, the album has sold 12.5 million copies worldwide.

Containing five US top 40 hits (including three that reached the top 10), Soul Provider achieved longevity on the charts. The album spent almost four years on the Billboard 200 and peaked at number 3. It was certified 6× Platinum by the Recording Industry Association of America (RIAA).

For the single version of "Georgia on My Mind", CBS edited out Michael Brecker's saxophone solo and replaced it with one by Kenny G.

Reception

Soul Provider has received generally mixed reviews from critics. AllMusic retrospectively described it as "more of the same", but noted that due to this album, Bolton "was now stoking the romantic fires in bedrooms across America". Robert Christgau gave the album a negative review, declaring Bolton to be "indistinguishable from pop metal except in the wattage of his guitar parts and the shamelessness of his song doctors." The Rolling Stone Album Guide described the album as the beginning of Bolton's descent into overdone and disrespectful covers, though they added that some of the self-penned performances on the album showed potential.

Track listing

Personnel 

 Michael Bolton – lead vocals, backing vocals (5, 6, 10)
 Robbie Buchanan – keyboards (1, 8, 9)
 Brad Cole – keyboards (1, 9)
 Richard Tee – keyboards (2)
 Eric Rehl – additional synthesizer (2), synthesizers (5)
 Michael Omartian – keyboards (3, 4), drums (3), synthesizers (10), backing vocals (10)
 Walter Afanasieff – additional keyboards (5, 7), percussion (5), synthesizers (7), drums (7)
 Gregg Mangiafico – keyboards (5)
 Phillip Ashley – keyboards (6), additional keyboards (8)
 Guy Roche – additional keyboards (6), arrangements (7)
 Diane Warren – keyboards (7)
 Louis Biancaniello – additional keyboard programming (7)
 Ren Klyce – additional synthesizer programming (7)
 Dan Shea – additional synthesizer programming (7)
 Barry Mann – keyboards (10)
 Dann Huff – guitar (1, 9)
 Steve Lukather – guitar (3)
 Michael Landau – guitar (4, 6, 8, 10), additional guitar (7)
 John McCurry – electric guitar (5), acoustic guitar (5), additional guitar (6)
 Chris Camozzi – guitar (7)
 Schuyler Deale – bass (2)
 Neil Stubenhaus – bass (4, 6, 8-10), additional intro bass (7)
 Hugh McDonald – bass (5)
 Peter Bunetta – drum programming (1)
 Chris Parker – drums (2)
 John Keane – drums (4, 6, 8, 10)
 Bobby Chouinard – drums (5)
 John Robinson – drums (9)
 Paulinho da Costa – percussion (9)
 Kenny G – saxophone solo (1)
 Michael Brecker – tenor saxophone (2)
 Jerry Peterson – saxophone solo (9)
 Jeff Pescetto – backing vocals (1)
 Sharon Robinson – backing vocals (1)
 Leslie Smith – backing vocals (1)
 Terry Brock – backing vocals (2)
 Jocelyn Brown – backing vocals (2)
 Robin Clark – backing vocals (2)
 Milt Grayson – backing vocals (2)
 Vicki Sue Robinson – backing vocals (2)
 Fonzi Thornton – backing vocals (2)
 Richard Marx – backing vocals (3)
 Joe Turano – backing vocals (3, 6)
 Kyf Brewer – backing vocals (5)
 Joe Cerisano – backing vocals (5)
 Desmond Child – backing vocals (5)
 Patricia Darcy – backing vocals (5)
 John Fiore – backing vocals (5, 6)
 Kate McGunnigle – backing vocals (5)
 Lou Merlino – backing vocals (5)
 Bernie Shanahan – backing vocals (5)
 Myriam Naomi Valle – backing vocals (5, 6)
 Suzie Benson – lead vocals (8)
 Jeanette Hawes - backing vocals (9)
 Wanda Vaughn – backing vocals (9)
 Syreeta Wright – backing vocals (9)

Production 
 Producers – Peter Bunetta and Rick Chudacoff (Tracks 1 & 9); Michael Bolton (Tracks 2, 6-8 & 10); Susan Hamilton (Track 2); Michael Omartian (Tracks 3, 4 & 10); Desmond Child (Track 5); Guy Roche (Track 7); Barry Mann (Track 10)
 Assistant producer on Track 7 – Walter Afanasieff
 Production coordination on Tracks 3 & 4 – Janet Hinde
 Production manager on Track 5 – Steve Savitt
 Production coordination on Track 7 – Doreen Dorian
 Engineers – Daren Klien (Tracks 1 & 9); Rick Kerr (Track 2); David Albert (Tracks 3, 4 & 10); Terry Christian (Track 3, 4, 6-8 & 10); Doug Carlton (Tracks 3, 4 & 10); Kevin Becka (Tracks 3, 4 & 10); Sir Arthur Payson (Track 5); Jay Healy (Tracks 6 & 8); Guy Roche (Track 7); Richard Piatt (Track 7)
 Additional recording – Jeff Balding, Gerry E. Brown, Mark Ettel and Gary Wagner (Tracks 1 & 9); Kevin Becka (Track 8)
 Assistant engineers – Bryant Arnett (Tracks 1 & 9), Laura Livingston (Tracks 1 & 9), Richard McKernon (Tracks 1 & 9), Marnie Riley (Tracks 1, 8 & 9), Steve Satkowski (Tracks 1 & 9); Tim Leitner, Paul Logus, Tony Van Horn and Michaek White (Track 2); Keith Goldstein, Roy Hendrickson, John Herman, Mike Krowiak, Danny Mormando and Joe Pirrera (Track 5); Kevin Becka (Tracks 6 & 7), Dary Sulich (Tracks 6 & 8), Rich Travali (Tracks 6 & 8), Tony Friedman (Track 7)
 Mixing – Mick Guzauski (Tracks 1, 7 & 8); Rick Kerr (Track 2); Terry Christian (Tracks 3, 4 & 10); Sir Arthur Payson (Track 5); David Thoener (Track 6); Gerry E. Brown (Track 9)
 Remix – Mick Guzauski (Track 4); David Frazer (Track 5); Arne Frager (Track 7)
 Mixed at Conway Studios (Hollywood, CA); Right Track Recording, The Hit Factory and Record Plant (New York City, New York)
 Remixed at The Plant (Sausalito, California)
 Mastered by Vlado Meller at CBS Records Studio (New York City, New York)
 Art direction and design – Christopher Austopchuk
 Photography – Glen Erler

Charts

Weekly charts

Year-end charts

Singles

Certifications

References 

Michael Bolton albums
1989 albums
Albums produced by Michael Omartian
Albums produced by Desmond Child
Columbia Records albums